The McKinley Marina is a public marina in Milwaukee, Wisconsin, on Lake Michigan.  Run by Milwaukee County, the facility is just north of Veteran's Park, at the north end of the Milwaukee harbor breakwater.  The marina is open from May 1 to October 31.

McKinley Marina offers slips with floating docks for rental.

External links 
McKinley Marina

Marinas in the United States
Sailing in Milwaukee
Buildings and structures in Milwaukee